Bris was a German Vorpostenboot that was built in 1941 as the minesweeper PT 25 for the Soviet Navy. She was seized by Germany before delivery and was used as a fishing trawler before being requisitioned by the Kriegsmarine, serving as V 315 Bris. She was lost in a collision in March 1945.

Description
She was powered by a triple expansion steam engine, which drove a single screw propeller.

History
Bris was built as yard number 746 by Norderwerft Köser & Meyer, Hamburg, Germany as the minesweeper PT 25 for the Soviet Navy. She was launched on 14 June 1941. She was seized by Germany on 26 June and was put to use as the fishing trawler Bris. On 3 February 1942, she entered Kriegsmarine service with 3 Vorpostenflotille as the vorpostenboot V 315 Bris. Armament was a 75 or 88mm cannon, two 37mm anti-aircraft guns, four to ten 20mm machine guns and six depth charge throwers. Her displacement was 1,250 tons. She sank in the Baltic Sea off Rixhöft on 12 March 1945 when she collided with the steamship .

References

Sources

1941 ships
Ships built in Hamburg
Fishing vessels of Germany
Steamships of Germany
Auxiliary ships of the Kriegsmarine
Maritime incidents in March 1945
World War II shipwrecks in the Baltic Sea